Esther Siamfuko (born 8 August 2004) is a Zambian footballer who plays as a defender for Queens Academy, on loan from Choma Warriors, and the Zambia women's national team.

Club career
Siamfuko has played for Choma Warriors and Queens Academy in Zambia.

International career
Siamfuko represented Zambia at the 2020 COSAFA Women's U17 Championship. She capped at senior level on 28 November 2020 in a 1–0 friendly away win against Chile.

References

2004 births
Living people
Zambian women's footballers
Women's association football defenders
Zambia women's international footballers
Footballers at the 2020 Summer Olympics
Olympic footballers of Zambia